Berit Stensønes (19 February 1956 – 5 June 2022) was a Norwegian mathematician specializing in complex analysis and complex dynamics and known for her work on several complex variables. She was a professor of mathematical sciences at the Norwegian University of Science and Technology (NTNU), and a professor emerita at the University of Michigan.

Education
Stensønes completed her Ph.D. in 1985 at Princeton University. Her dissertation, Envelopes of Holomorphy, was supervised by John Erik Fornæss.

Book
With John Erik Fornæss, Stensønes was an author of the book Lectures on Counterexamples in Several Complex Variables (AMS Chelsea Publishing, American Mathematical Society, 1987; reprinted 2007).

Recognition
Stensønes was a member of the Royal Norwegian Society of Sciences and Letters.

References

1956 births
2022 deaths
Norwegian mathematicians
Norwegian women mathematicians
Norwegian expatriates in the United States
Princeton University alumni
University of Michigan faculty
Academic staff of the Norwegian University of Science and Technology
Royal Norwegian Society of Sciences and Letters